Kenneth Lane (August 16, 1923 - January 22, 2010) was a Canadian sprint canoeist who competed in the early 1950s. He won a silver medal in the C-2 10000 m event at the 1952 Summer Olympics in Helsinki.

Lane was born in Toronto, Ontario. He was a lifetime member of the Balmy Beach Canoe Club. He won his first Canadian championship in 1946 in the C1 event. In his career, he won 14 gold medals and 19 Canadian championships. He, along with Don Hawgood won the silver medal at the 1952 Summer Olympics in a photo-finish. Lane continued to race in masters competition until 1991. He was inducted into the Canadian Olympic Hall of Fame in 2003.

Lane remained in the sport as an administrator, helping to found Canoe Ontario. Lane managed the Canadian national team in the 1967 Pan-Am Games and the 1972 Olympics. He was an administrator of the Western Ontario division of the Canadian Canoe Association from 1945 to 2000.

Lane received the following awards:
 R. Edgar Gilbert Award
 Queen's Jubilee Award 
 Canadian Olympic Hall of Fame

References

External links
Sports-reference.com profile

1923 births
Canadian male canoeists
Canoeists at the 1952 Summer Olympics
2010 deaths
Olympic canoeists of Canada
Olympic silver medalists for Canada
Canoeists from Toronto
Olympic medalists in canoeing
Medalists at the 1952 Summer Olympics